Scopula addictaria is a moth of the family Geometridae. It was described by Francis Walker in 1861. It is found in Sri Lanka.

Description
Hindwings with more or less angled outer margin at vein 4. It is an ochreous-white moth with bright ochreous. Postmedial line of forewings sinuous and much excurved below costa instead of minutely waved. The patches bright rufous, and the sub-marginal markings bluish grey.

References

External links

Moths described in 1861
addictaria
Moths of Asia